is a Japanese manga series written and illustrated by Kajimoto Yukihiro. It was serialized in Kodansha's Shōnen Magazine R from August 2016 to June 2018.

Publication
Ayanashi is written and illustrated by Kajimoto Yukihiro. It was serialized in Kodansha's  from August 20, 2016, to June 20, 2018. Kodansha collected its chapters in four tankōbon volumes, released from February 17, 2017, to August 17, 2018.

In North America, Kodansha USA released the manga in digital format. The four volumes were published from December 5, 2017, to January 29, 2019.

Volume list

References

Further reading

External links
 

Adventure anime and manga
Dark fantasy anime and manga
Kodansha manga
Shōnen manga